"Hurricane" is a song co-written by Thom Schuyler, Keith Stegall, and Stewart Harris. Levon Helm recorded it for his 1980 album American Son. It was later recorded by American country music singer Leon Everette. It was released in July 1981 as the lead single and title track from Everette's album Hurricane. It is Everette's highest-charting single, peaking at No. 4 on the Billboard Hot Country Singles chart in September 1981. Band of Heathens, an American rock band, also charted a rendition of the song in 2018.

Content
The song is about an old man who lives in the famed New Orleans French Quarter.  The man is unfazed when told that a hurricane was about to hit the city; even when "a man from Chicago" claims that the levees need to be raised, he claims that the levees will hold and the man will be "on his way to Illinois".

Critical reception
Jerry Sharpe of The Pittsburgh Press wrote that the song "defeats the standard old formulas for successful country music lyrics — no love story, no sex, no booze, no tragedy." An uncredited review in Billboard said that "Everette's distinctive vocals are the perfect vehicle for this tale of man's struggle against the elements." Dave Marsh was less favorable  in The New Rolling Stone Record Guide, calling Everette a "poor man's Johnny Lee" and said the song was "almost an interesting ballad".

Charts

Weekly charts

Year-end charts

Cover versions
American rock band Band of Heathens charted a rendition of "Hurricane" in 2018, reaching number 18 on Hot Rock Songs.

References

1981 singles
Leon Everette songs
Songs written by Keith Stegall
Songs written by Thom Schuyler
Songs about New Orleans
Songs written by Stewart Harris
RCA Records Nashville singles
1980 songs